Oscar Ågren (1914 – 1992) was a Swedish boxer who competed in the 1937 European Amateur Boxing Championships and in the 1939 European Amateur Boxing Championships.

He twice won the bronze medal at Milan 1937 and Dublin 1939, respectively in the Welterweight and Middleweight classes.

References

1914 births
1992 deaths
Swedish male boxers
Middleweight boxers
20th-century Swedish people